The 1971–72 Midland Football Combination season was the 35th in the history of Midland Football Combination, a football competition in England.

Division One

Division One featured 17 clubs which competed in the division last season along with one new club:
Solihull Borough, promoted from Division One

League table

References

1971–72
M